David Tisdale,  (September 8, 1835 – March 31, 1911) was a Canadian politician.

Biography 
Born in Charlotteville Township, Upper Canada, the son of Ephraim Tisdale and Hannah Price, he was educated at the Simcoe Grammar School and called to the Ontario bar in 1858. He was made a Queen's Counsel in 1872. He served in the Canadian Militia at the time of the Trent Affair in 1861, was promoted Captain in 1862 and at Niagara in 1865. He also did service during the Fenian raids in 1866. He was appointed Lieutenant-Colonel of the 39th Norfolk Battalion of Rifles on September 28, 1866. He retired, retaining his rank, in 1876. He served on the town council for Simcoe, also serving as reeve and as a member of the council for Norfolk County. Tisdale was president of the Crown Life Insurance Company, the St. Clair and Erie Ship Canal Company and the Wawa Gold Mining Company.

He ran but was defeated for the House of Commons of Canada in the 1874 federal election in the riding of Norfolk North, but was elected in 1887 in Norfolk South. A Conservative, he was re-elected in 1891, 1896, 1900, and 1904. In 1896, he was the Minister of Militia and Defence.

Tisdale married Sarah Araminta Walker in 1858.

References

1835 births
1911 deaths
Conservative Party of Canada (1867–1942) MPs
Members of the House of Commons of Canada from Ontario
Members of the King's Privy Council for Canada
People of the Fenian raids
People from Norfolk County, Ontario
Canadian King's Counsel

Canadian Militia officers